Officer Donald Leslie "Don" Orville is a fictional character in the NBC sitcom 3rd Rock from the Sun. He is portrayed by Wayne Knight and works as a Police Sergeant in the fictional town of Rutherford, Ohio, though he is consistently referred to as "Officer" throughout the series.

Work
Although Don works as a police officer and later sergeant throughout the series, he is often shown to be somewhat incompetent. In The Physics of Being Dick, he lets Dick interrogate a criminal with him, despite it being highly illegal. When he is paged, he also never appears to know what any of the crime codes actually mean.

Don is known to make a blunder of things, for example, in Stuck With Dick, when he thinks Mary's house has been broken into, he attempts to burst in through the front door and ends up shouting "Ass right there, freeze hole!" In Dick's Big Giant Headache, Part II, he also claims to be always losing things, adding "I even lost a whole dead guy once”.

As the final season draws to a close, Sally discovers him hiding in a frozen food's freezer during the robbery of a local store, in which he admits that he is a coward who only joined the police force because he thought he'd be safe around all the other officers. He subsequently retires from the Rutherford Police Department to open a muffin shop before being convinced by Sally to re-enlist.  Eventually, Don is rehired at the rank of Police Officer.

Relationship 
Throughout the series, he maintains an on-off relationship with Sally Solomon, a coupling which sees her in the dominant position, able to persuade him to do anything she wants.

As an ongoing gag on the show, one of the pair is always able to tell when the other has entered the room, where Don will gaze at Sally lustfully and say "Hello Sally" and she gazes at him in a sultry way and answers, "Hi Don."  Another running gag for the pair is that the conversations held between them are somewhat dramatic, and reminiscent of an old film noir 1930s crime drama.

In the Alternate Universe, Don is still dating Sally, but he is the philandering Mayor of New York City. He also admits to being married, which causes Sally to break up with him again because she cannot take the guilt.

Musical Talent 
Officer Don has a hidden musical talent in the form of being a first-class singer, of wide vocal range and style. This first became evident when he and Sally went out for a night of Karaoke. He was mobbed by admirers at his entrance to the venue, and his stellar performance quickly explained why. On returning to the house, Sally confided that Don was a "Karaoke god!" to her delight and surprise.

Trivia 
Don's name is based on "Officer Don" and "Orville the Green Dragon", who were characters on the local Atlanta NBC affiliate from the 1950s through the 1970s. The creators of the show named Don as a tribute to WSB-TV's "The Popeye Club", an afternoon kiddie show that was hosted by "Officer Don" and played by announcer Don Kennedy. "Orville" was a dragon puppet.

Notes

External links

3rd Rock from the Sun characters
Fictional characters from Ohio
Fictional American police officers
Fictional police sergeants
Television characters introduced in 1996
https://en.wikipedia.org/wiki/Don_Kennedy